Bobi-Diarabana is a sub-prefecture in north-western Ivory Coast. It is in Séguéla Department, Worodougou Region, Woroba District. The seat of the sub-prefecture is the town of Diarabana.

Bobi-Diarabana is one of the few sub-prefectures in Ivory Coast that does not have the same name as its seat.

Bobi-Diarabana was a commune until March 2012, when it became one of 1126 communes nationwide that were abolished.

Notes

Sub-prefectures of Worodougou
Former communes of Ivory Coast